The 2013–14 season will be Pécsi Mecsek FC's 49th competitive season, 3rd consecutive season in the OTP Bank Liga and 63rd year in existence as a football club.

First team squad

Transfers

Summer

In:

Out:

Winter

In:

Out:

List of Hungarian football transfers summer 2013
List of Hungarian football transfers winter 2013–14

Statistics

Appearances and goals
Last updated on 1 June 2014.

|-
|colspan="14"|Youth players:

|-
|colspan="14"|Players no longer at the club:

|}

Top scorers
Includes all competitive matches. The list is sorted by shirt number when total goals are equal.

Last updated on 1 June 2014

Disciplinary record
Includes all competitive matches. Players with 1 card or more included only.

Last updated on 1 June 2014

Overall
{|class="wikitable"
|-
|Games played || 45 (30 OTP Bank Liga, 5 Hungarian Cup and 10 Hungarian League Cup)
|-
|Games won || 18 (12 OTP Bank Liga, 2 Hungarian Cup and 4 Hungarian League Cup)
|-
|Games drawn || 13 (9 OTP Bank Liga, 1 Hungarian Cup and 3 Hungarian League Cup)
|-
|Games lost || 14 (9 OTP Bank Liga, 2 Hungarian Cup and 3 Hungarian League Cup)
|-
|Goals scored || 63
|-
|Goals conceded || 61
|-
|Goal difference || +2
|-
|Yellow cards || 77
|-
|Red cards || 8
|-
|rowspan="1"|Worst discipline ||  Dávid Mohl (7 , 1 )
|-
|rowspan="2"|Best result || 3–0 (H) v Zalaegerszeg – Ligakupa – 04-09-2013
|-
| 5–2 (A) v Győr – OTP Bank Liga – 09-03-2014
|-
|rowspan="2"|Worst result || 1–5 (A) v Videoton – OTP Bank Liga – 11-08-2013
|-
| 0–5 (4) v Újpest – Magyar Kupa – 26-03-2014
|-
|rowspan="1"|Most appearances ||  Dávid Márkvárt (38 appearances)
|-
|rowspan="1"|Top scorer ||  Krisztián Koller (13 goals)
|-
|Points || 67/135 (49.63%)
|-

Nemzeti Bajnokság I

Matches

Classification

Results summary

Results by round

Hungarian Cup

League Cup

Group stage

Classification

Knockout phase

Pre-season

References

External links
 Eufo
 Official Website
 UEFA
 fixtures and results

Pécsi MFC seasons
Hungarian football clubs 2013–14 season